Kostov (Bulgarian or Russian: Костов) is a Bulgarian masculine surname, its feminine counterpart is Kostova. It may refer to

 Aleksandar Kostov (born 1938), Bulgarian football player
Ani Kostova (born 1960), Bulgarian swimmer
Boyanka Kostova (born 1993), Bulgarian-Azerbaijani weightlifter
 Dimo Kostov (born 1947), Bulgarian wrestler
Elitsa Kostova (born 1990), Bulgarian tennis player 
Elizabeth Kostova (born 1964), American author 
 Hari Kostov (born 1959), Macedonian politician
 Ivan Kostov Nikolov (1913–2004), Bulgarian geologist and mineralogist
 Ivan Yordanov Kostov (born 1949), Bulgarian politician
 Julian Kostov (born 1989), Bulgarian actor, filmmaker, swimmer, and pentathlete
 Kristian Kostov (born 2000), born Russian (half Bulgarian—half Kazakh) singer
Liliana Kostova (born 1988), Bulgarian football striker
 Stanislav Kostov (born 1991), Bulgarian football player
 Traicho Kostov (1897–1949), Bulgarian politician

Bulgarian-language surnames